The Miles M.100 Student was built as a lightweight trainer as a private venture by F.G. and George Miles with development started in 1953. Although not specifically a Miles product, it was promoted as a British Royal Air Force trainer but failed to enter production.

Design and development

Building on the company's experience with the M.77 "Sparrowjet", the M.100 Student was a two-seat, side-by-side, all-metal jet trainer. The M.100 prototype was powered by a 400 kgf (882 lb) thrust Turbomeca Marbore turbojet and flew for the first time on 15 May 1957. Miles had hoped to secure an RAF order, but the contract went to the Jet Provost.  The Student was proposed for several training programmes, but without success.

G-APLK, the sole aircraft, was allocated XS941 when developed in the Mark 2 version as a prospective Counter-insurgency type. It was tested by the Royal Air Force but was not accepted and therefore did not go into production.

The M.100 Student 2, re-registered G-MIOO, was badly damaged in a crash on 24 August 1985 and is now at the Museum of Berkshire Aviation .

The Centurion 3, 4 and 5 were planned variants  with the RB.108, Gourdon and Arbizon engines respectively.

Variants
Data from:''' Jane's All the World's Aircraft 1958-59
M.100 Mk.1 Student:  Blackburn-Turbomeca Marboré IIA engine ; sole prototype G-APLK / XS491.
M.100 Mk.2 Student:  Continental J69 engine; G-APLK re-registered as G-MIOO.
M.100 Mk.3 Centurion:  Rolls-Royce RB.108 engine (de-rated) ; not built.
M.100 Mk.4 Centurion:  Turbomeca Gourdon engine ; not built.
M.100 Mk.5 Centurion: 2x  Turbomeca Arbizon engines ; not built.

Specifications (M.100 Mk.1 Student)

See also

References
Notes

Bibliography

 Amos, Peter. and Don Lambert Brown. Miles Aircraft Since 1925, Volume 1. London: Putnam Aeronautical, 2000. .
 "British Military Aircraft 1958". Flight, 29 August 1958, p. 381.  
 Brown, Don Lambert. Miles Aircraft Since 1925. London: Putnam & Company Ltd., 1970. . 
 Henley, Don. "Jet Age:The Miles Sparrowjet and Student Part One". Air Enthusiast, No. 69 May/June 1997. ISSN 0143-5450. pp. 58–61.
 Jackson, A.J. British Civil Aircraft since 1919, Volume 3. London: Putnam & Company Ltd., 1974. ISBN 
 "Miles M.100 Student: A Promising New Jet Trainer Under Construction at Shoreham". Flight, 16 December 1955, pp. 915–917.
 "Minting a New Coin at Shoreham: Miles Engineering's Student/Graduate Mini-striker". Flight, 15 October 1964, pp. 665–666.
 Temple, Julian C. Wings Over Woodley - The Story of Miles Aircraft and the Adwest Group''. Bourne End, Bucks, UK: Aston Publications, 1987. .

External links

 Miles Aircraft 
 Flight 1957

1950s British military trainer aircraft
Student
Single-engined jet aircraft
Aircraft first flown in 1957